Juan Caro de Tavira was a Spanish painter, who flourished in the 17th century. He was a native of Carmona and pupil of Francisco de Zurbarán. He died young, but his skill procured him the cross of Santiago from Philip IV of Spain.

References

Spanish Baroque painters
17th-century Spanish painters
Spanish male painters